Reigate railway station serves the town of Reigate, Surrey, England, on the North Downs Line. It is  measured from  via . The station is managed by Southern.

History
The original Reigate stations were located two miles from the town centre in a hamlet then known as Warwick Town but which later became Redhill. Red Hill and Reigate Road station was opened by the London and Brighton Railway on 12 July 1841. The nearby town was then served by a horse-drawn omnibus service operated by the railway. This was followed on 26 May 1842 by the South Eastern Railway (SER) Red Hill station (later misleadingly renamed 'Reigate'). Both these stations closed on 15 April 1844 when a new joint Redhill and Reigate station opened on the site of the present Redhill railway station.

The current Reigate station opened 4 July 1849 with the opening of the branch line from Redhill to Reigate by the Reading, Guildford and Reigate Railway; the original station building from that time is still in use today. The station was initially called Reigate Town. The station was operated by the SER until 1898, the South Eastern and Chatham Railway until 1922, the Southern Railway (UK) until 1947 and British Railways until 1997.

The line to Redhill to Reigate was electrified on 1 January 1933 but the remainder remains unelectrified.

Services
The station is managed by Southern, who are one of two train operators from the station alongside Great Western Railway.

Southern
As of February 2020, Southern operates services to and from  via , which start and terminate at Reigate. Since May 2018, these services run half-hourly on weekdays and Saturdays, and hourly on Sundays; this is a significant improvement, as previously Southern served Reigate with only one train per hour six days a week with no Sunday service.

Great Western Railway

On Sundays the service remains largely the same with 2 trains per hour to Reading (one semi-fast, one stopping) in the westbound direction. All trains terminate at Redhill on Sundays with no hourly extensions to Gatwick Airport.

Route table

Layout
The station has two platforms, numbered from left to right when looking towards Redhill. Platform 1 is long enough for an eight-car train but platform 2 can only accommodate up to six carriages. The platforms are connected by a subway.

Platform 1 is served by through services going eastbound towards Redhill and Gatwick Airport. Platform 2 is used by all westbound services towards Dorking, Guildford and Reading, as well as by eastbound services to Redhill and London that originate at Reigate.

There is an electrified siding to the east of station on the south side.

Future
In 2020, Network Rail announced that they are planning to upgrade Reigate station, which includes constructing a new 12-carriage bay platform (number 3) on the south side of the station, and extending the existing platform 2 to also accommodate 12-car trains. Currently the track layout just east of the station forces Southern to turn its trains around on platform 2, and since this platform is not long enough to accommodate 8-car sets, Southern services to and from Reigate are limited to 4 carriages in length. The upgrade would enable longer trains to serve the station, and the new bay platform would allow trains to/from London to terminate there instead of occupying the through westbound track, thus improving reliability on the whole line.

Signal box
 
The station also incorporates a signal box, built in 1929 to replace an earlier box at the other end of the station. This remains in use to operate the Level crossing gates and other signals along the North Downs Line.

References

External links 

Railway stations in Surrey
Former South Eastern Railway (UK) stations
Railway stations in Great Britain opened in 1849
Railway stations served by Great Western Railway
Railway stations served by Govia Thameslink Railway
1849 establishments in England
Reigate